Sebastian Dumitru Huţan (born 26 October 1983 in Arad) is a Romanian retired footballer who played as a goalkeeper.

Honours
Sheriff Tiraspol
 Divizia Naţională: 2002–03, 2003–04, 2004–05, 2005–06, 2006–07
 Moldovan Cup: 2006
 Moldovan Super Cup: 2003
 CIS Cup: 2003

References

External links
 
 
 

1983 births
Living people
Sportspeople from Arad, Romania
Romanian footballers
Association football goalkeepers
Romania youth international footballers
Romania under-21 international footballers
Liga I players
Liga II players
Moldovan Super Liga players
Russian Premier League players
FC UTA Arad players
FC Sheriff Tiraspol players
FC Vaslui players
FC Dynamo Moscow reserves players
CF Liberty Oradea players
FC Universitatea Cluj players
FC Politehnica Iași (2010) players
Romanian expatriate footballers
Romanian expatriate sportspeople in Moldova
Expatriate footballers in Moldova
Romanian expatriate sportspeople in Russia
Expatriate footballers in Russia